La Tuca was a ski resort in Betrén, a village in the municipality of Vielha e Mijaran, in the Aran Valley, Spain,It was open from 1972 to 1989. 

It is planned to be reopened in 2011.

Notes 

Defunct ski areas and resorts
Ski areas and resorts in Catalonia